This list 2019 in paleomalacology is a list of new taxa of ammonites and other fossil cephalopods, as well as fossil gastropods, bivalves and other molluscs that are scheduled to be described during the year 2019, as well as other significant discoveries and events related to molluscan paleontology that are scheduled to occur in the year 2019.

General research
 Description of an assemblage of conchiferan mollusks from the Cambrian Shackleton Limestone (Antarctica) is published by Claybourn et al. (2019).
 A study on Early Triassic recovery of ammonites and gastropods after the Permian–Triassic extinction event is published by Pietsch et al. (2019).
 A study on the impact of the Cenomanian-Turonian boundary event and other Cretaceous oceanic anoxic events on generic- and species-level molluscan diversity, extinction rates and ecological turnover is published by Freymueller, Moore & Myers (2019).
 A juvenile ammonite specimen assigned to the genus Puzosia and four marine gastropods are reported from the Cretaceous Burmese amber of Myanmar by Yu et al. (2019).
 A study on the timing and nature of recovery of benthic marine ecosystems of Antarctica after the Cretaceous–Paleogene extinction event, as indicated by data from fossils of benthic molluscs, is published by Whittle et al. (2019).

Ammonites

Research

 Dimorphic Indonesian ammonite Macrocephalites keeuwensis is reported from the core of Jara Dome (Kutch district, India) by Jain (2019).
 Description of new fossils of members of the genus Lytohoplites from the Neuquén Basin (Argentina), taxonomic revision of the Lytohoplites species occurring in this basin, and a study on the ontogeny, probable sexual dimorphism and spectrum of intraspecific variability of members of this genus, is published by Vennari & Aguirre-Urreta (2019).
 A study on the intraspecific variation through the ontogeny of the Late Cretaceous ammonite Scaphites whitfieldi from the Western Interior of the United States is published by Klein & Landman (2019).
 A lower jaw of Spathites puercoensis is described from the Turonian Carlile Member of the Mancos Shale (New Mexico, United States) by Landman et al. (2019).
 A study on periodic variations in carbon and oxygen stable isotope profiles from Campanian and Maastrichtian ammonites belonging to the genus Baculites, and on their implications for inferring the life histories of these ammonites, is published by Ellis & Tobin (2019).
 A study on the hydrostatic properties of the orthoconic morphotype of Baculites compressus and on their implications for the knowledge of the mode of life of this animal is published by Peterman et al. (2019).
 A study on the ecology and growth of baculitid and scaphitid ammonites from the Maastrichtian Owl Creek Formation (Mississippi, United States), evaluating whether these taxa may have migrated, is published by Ferguson et al. (2019).
 A study on a sutural anomaly of ammonite specimens known as sutural pseudoinversion is published by Rogov (2019).
 A study on the systematics of Late Cretaceous ammonites from the southeastern San Juan Basin (Sandoval County, New Mexico) and on the stratigraphic framework of their fossils is published by Sealey & Lucas (2019).
 A study on the ontogenetic trajectories of septal spacing between succeeding chambers in Hypophylloceras subramosum and Phyllopachyceras ezoense is published online by Iwasaki, Iwasaki & Wani (2019).
 A study on the intra- and interspecific variation and ontogenetic trajectories of the kossmaticeratid species Maorites densicostatus and Maorites seymourianus is published by Morón-Alfonso (2019).
 A pathological ammonite specimen characterized by a pronounced left-right asymmetry in both ornamentation and suture lines is described from the Toarcian of southern France by Jattiot et al. (2019).
 A study on the morphology and function of hook‐like structures found in the body chambers of six specimens of Rhaeboceras halli is published online by Kruta et al. (2019).

New taxa

Other cephalopods

Research
 A study on hydrostatic properties of early Paleozoic nautiloid and endoceratoid cephalopods, and on its implications for the knowledge of ecology of these cephalopods, is published by Peterman, Barton & Yacobucci (2019).
 A study on the distribution and diversity of cephalopods during the Cambrian–Ordovician transition is published by Fang et al. (2019).
 A study on cephalopod occurrences in South China and adjacent areas during the Middle to Late Ordovician, aiming to define biogeographic provinces, is published by Fang et al. (2019).
 A study on changes of geographic range size and rates of speciation and extinction in nautiloid and ammonoid cephalopods living in the North American Midcontinent Sea from the Carboniferous (Pennsylvanian)-early Permian is published by Kolis & Lieberman (2019).
 Ascocerid fossils are described from the Hirnantian?–Llandovery strata of the Eusebio Ayala and Vargas Peña formations (southeastern Paraguay) by Cichowolski et al. (2019), representing the first ascocerid record from high paleolatitudes of Gondwana.
 A juvenile specimen of Dolorthoceras, representing the first Devonian cephalopod specimen preserving nacreous structures and the first ectocochleate cephalopod preserving fibrous structures within its conch, is described from the Frasnian Domanic Formation (Russia) by Doguzhaeva (2019).
 A study on the response of cephalopod assemblages from the area of the present-day European Russia to environmental changes during the early Aptian Oceanic Anoxic Event is published by Rogov et al. (2019).
 A study on the paleobiology of cephalopods from the Albian Mahajanga Basin of Madagascar will be published by Hoffmann et al. (2019).
 A proposal for revision of the classification of nautiloid cephalopods presented in Treatise Part K is presented by King & Evans (2019), who name a new subclass Tarphyceratia, new order Rioceratida and new family Bactroceratidae.
 A study on embryonic and early juvenile development of shell in Peismoceras is published by Manda & Turek (2019).
 A study on changes of the morphological diversity of Late Permian coiled nautiloids is published online by Korn et al. (2019).
 A study on the paleobiology of Angulithes mermeti, based on new material from the upper Cenomanian of Egypt, and on its implications for the knowledge of the evolution of Cenomanian lineage of Angulithes, is published by Wilmsen & Nagm (2019).
 A study on the anatomy of Gordoniconus beargulchensis and on its implications for the knowledge of evolution of coleoids is published by Klug et al. (2019).
 A study on a putative Sinemurian octocoral Mesosceptron from Montagna del Casale (Sicily, Italy) is published by Pignatti et al. (2019), who reinterpret the fossils of this taxon as incompletely preserved coleoid rostra, and consider Mesosceptron to be a subjective junior synonym of the genus Atractites.
 A study on four specimens of Clarkeiteuthis conocauda from the Toarcian Posidonia Shale (Germany) preserved with small bony fish in their arm crowns, on the feeding behaviour of members of this species, and on the differences in the mode of life of C. conocauda, Passaloteuthis bisulcata and Hibolithes semisulcatus, is published by Jenny et al. (2019).
 A study on belemnite body-size dynamics across the Pliensbachian–Toarcian boundary in the Peniche section (Lusitanian Basin, Portugal), evaluating its implications for the knowledge of the impact of the Pliensbachian–Toarcian boundary warming event on belemnite body size, is published by Rita et al. (2019).
 New belemnite fossils are described from the Berriasian–Hauterivian of Arctic Canada and North-East Greenland by Mutterlose et al. (2019), who also evaluate the implications of these fossils for the knowledge of spatial distribution patterns of belemnites at northern high latitudes.

New taxa

Gastropods

Research
 A study on the diversity of gastropod larval conch fossil assemblages of ages ranging from the Ordovician to Carboniferous is published online by Dzik (2019).
 A study on the recovery of gastropods in the aftermath of the Cretaceous–Paleogene extinction event, based on data from fossils from the former Ankerpoort‐Curfs quarry (Geulhem, the Netherlands), is published online by Vellekoop et al. (2019).
 A probable cyclophoroidean gastropod, possibly a member of the family Cyclophoridae, is described from the Cretaceous amber from Myanmar by Xing et al. (2019), constituting the first confirmed and oldest record of soft-bodied preservation of a snail in Cretaceous amber.
 A study on the nature of the size dimorphism in the Miocene gastropod Persististrombus deperditus, and on the causes of its evolution, is published by Halder & Paira (2019).
 New specimens of Spinucella reimersi are described from the Miocene Gram Clay of Denmark by Schnetler (2019), who also provides an emended description of this species.
 A revision of extant and Neogene members of the genus Antistreptus from the southwestern Atlantic Ocean is published by Pastorino & Griffin (2019).

New taxa

Other molluscs

Research
 A study on shell microstructures of specimens of Anabarella australis from the Cambrian Series 2 Xinji Formation of the North China Block is published by Li et al. (2019).
 A study on the relative importance of bivalves and brachiopods in the fossil assemblages from the Carboniferous Pennsylvanian Breathitt Formation of Kentucky is published by Hsieh, Bush & Bennington (2019).
 A study on transitional Permian-Triassic bivalve fauna from five sections of littoral clastic facies in southwestern China is published by Song et al. (2019).
 A study on body size changes in bivalves in the aftermath of the Permian–Triassic extinction event is published online by Atkinson & Wignall (2019).
 A study on changes of body size of bivalves belonging to the family Limidae prior to, and in the aftermath of the Triassic–Jurassic extinction event is published by Atkinson et al. (2019).
 A study on changes in the body size of benthic marine bivalves and brachiopods from the Lusitanian Basin (Portugal) before the Toarcian oceanic anoxic event is published by Piazza et al. (2019).
 A study on the impact of the early Toarcian extinction event on fossil brachiopods and bivalves known from the Iberian Range (Spain) is published by Danise et al. (2019).
 A study on the impact of the Early Toarcian Oceanic Anoxic Event on the population of the bivalve species Posidonotis cancellata from the Neuquén Basin (Argentina) is published by Franch et al. (2019).
 A study on the temporal and spatial distribution of pectinid and ostreid bivalves in Middle and Late Jurassic sequences exposed in the Tanggula Mountains (China) is published by Sha (2019).
 A study on muscle attachment sites preserved in phosphatized inoceramid Gnesioceramus anglicus, and on their implications for inferring the palaeobiology of inoceramid bivalves, is published by Knight & Morris (2019).
 A sclerochronological study of shells of the gigantic inoceramids Sphenoceramus schmidti and S. sachalinensis from the middle Campanian Yezo Basin in Hokkaido (Japan) is published by Walliser et al. (2019).
 A study on the relationship of growth rate in the scallop Carolinapecten eboreus to temperature and primary production, and on its implications for inferring the cause of extinction of this species, is published by Johnson et al. (2019).

New taxa

References

2019 in paleontology
Paleomalacology
Molluscs described in 2019